Metin Akdurak (born 21 February 1936) is a Turkish sailor. He competed in the 1964 Summer Olympics.

References

1936 births
Living people
Sailors at the 1964 Summer Olympics – Flying Dutchman
Turkish male sailors (sport)
Olympic sailors of Turkey